is a one to four-player NES/arcade game released by SNK in 1988.

Summary
 
The player can choose between four different golfers with varying advantages and disadvantages. Lee Trevino (who lent his endorsement to this North American NES version of the game) is playable (only in the North American version) as a character named Super Mex (an actual nickname of his; the Japanese version uses a character named Birdie Tommy in place of Trevino himself); other characters include Pretty Amy/Eri, Miracle Chosuke and Big Jumbo. Pretty Amy has limited range, but the easiest control ("control" refers to the length of the aiming guide). Miracle Chosuke and Super Mex have average attributes. Big Jumbo has the best range, but the worst control. Despite the title, no fighting is involved in the game. The player has to avoid sand traps, water hazards, rough ground and trees.

The courses range from relatively straightforward fairways to elaborate arrangements of sand traps. The two courses available for play are the United States, which consists of mostly bunkers and super rough, and the Japan course, consisting of water and tight boundaries.  The United States course is modeled after PGA West Stadium Course.

At the end of the game, the player is greeted with a photorealistic shot of the country club lodge against the setting sun and surrounded by trees.

Reception 
In Japan, Game Machine listed Lee Trevino's Fighting Golf on their May 1, 1988 issue as being the ninth most-successful table arcade unit of the month.

GameRevolution ranked this game as #23 on the 50 Worst Video Game Names of All Time list.

Legacy 
The game was parodied in the season 7 episode of The Simpsons titled "Marge Be Not Proud", with the game in the episode called Lee Carvallo's Putting Challenge. The episode mocks how boring and mundane golf video games are and during the credits, Bart is playing the game and is making decisions against Carvallo's suggestions to try to make the game fun, yet he ends up getting bored fast and eventually quits playing.

References

External links

1988 video games
Arcade video games
Golf video games
Nintendo Entertainment System games
Sports video games set in the United States
Video games set in Japan
SNK games
Trevino
Trevino
Video games based on real people
Video games developed in Japan